was the sixth of twenty-four s, built for the Imperial Japanese Navy following World War I. They served as first-line destroyers through the 1930s, and remained formidable weapons systems well into the Pacific War.

History
Construction of the advanced Fubuki-class destroyers was authorized as part of the Imperial Japanese Navy's expansion program from fiscal year 1923, intended to give Japan a qualitative edge with the world's most modern ships. The Fubuki class had performance that was a quantum leap over previous destroyer designs, so much so that they were designated . The large size, powerful engines, high speed, large radius of action and unprecedented armament gave these destroyers the firepower similar to many light cruisers in other navies. Shinonome, built at the Sasebo Naval Arsenal was laid down on 12 August 1926, launched on 26 November 1927 and commissioned on 25 July 1928. Originally assigned hull designation “Destroyer No. 40”, she was completed as Shinonome.

Operational history
On completion, Shinonome was assigned to Destroyer Division 12 under the IJN 2nd Fleet. During the Second Sino-Japanese War, Shinonome was assigned to patrols of the southern China coast, and participated in the Invasion of French Indochina in 1940.

World War II history
At the time of the attack on Pearl Harbor, Shinonome was assigned to Destroyer Division 12 of Destroyer Squadron 3 of the IJN 1st Fleet, and had deployed from Kure Naval District to the port of Samah on Hainan Island. From 4 December to 12 December, she covered Japanese landings at Kota Bharu in Malaya.

From 16 December, Shinonome was assigned to cover Japanese landings during "Operation B", the invasion of British Borneo.  The Shinonome was sunk on 17 December 1941, after being struck by two bombs from a Dornier Do 24 flying boat X-32 of the Royal Dutch Naval Air Group GVT-7, which detonated her aft magazine. The Shinonome exploded and sank with all hands in the vicinity of Miri, Sarawak 

On 15 January 1942, Shinonome was struck from the navy list.

Shinonome wreckage
The exact position of the wreck of Shinonome remains unknown, but it likely lies somewhere between Seria, Brunei to the north, and Miri town itself.  A team of wreck researchers, based in Miri and with help from the Netherlands, has been searching for the ship's remains since 2004. The team has identified several prospective sites, and is in the process of confirming them.  The position, orientation and condition of the wreck will help to resolve the lingering uncertainty about the circumstances surrounding the Shinonomes demise.

Notes

References

External links

Shirakumo in Naval History of World Wars

Fubuki-class destroyers
Ships built by Sasebo Naval Arsenal
1927 ships
Second Sino-Japanese War naval ships of Japan
World War II destroyers of Japan
Destroyers sunk by aircraft
World War II shipwrecks in the South China Sea
Maritime incidents in December 1941
Ships lost with all hands
Naval magazine explosions